Marcus Christie may refer to:
 Marcus Christie (cyclist) (born 1991), Irish racing cyclist
 Marcus Christie (EastEnders), fictional character